This is a list of the mayors of the Municipality of Leichhardt, a former local government area of New South Wales, Australia. The official title of Mayors while holding office was: His/Her Worship The Mayor of Leichhardt. First incorporated on 29 December 1871 as the Municipal District of Leichhardt, the municipality commenced operations on 14 December 1871 and the election of the first Council was held on 6 February 1872. The first mayor was Alderman Frank Beames, elected at the first meeting of the council on 16 February 1872. From 1 January 1949, with the passing of the Local Government (Areas) Act 1948, Leichhardt was reconstituted incorporating the former municipalities of Annandale and Balmain. The last Mayor of Leichhardt was Councillor Darcy Byrne (ALP), first elected on 25 September 2012, who served until the council's amalgamation into the new Inner West Council, which was established on 12 May 2016.

Mayors

Municipality of Leichhardt, 1872–1948

Municipality of Leichhardt, 1949–2016

References

External links
 Leichhardt – Mayors and Aldermen (Inner West Council)

 
Leichhardt
Mayors of Leichhardt
Mayors Leichhardt
Inner West